Coahuilaceratops (meaning "Coahuila horn face") is a genus of herbivorous ceratopsian dinosaur. It is a chasmosaurine ceratopsian which lived during the Late Cretaceous period (late Campanian stage) in what is now southern Coahuila in northern Mexico. It is known from the holotype CPC 276, a partial skeleton of an adult individual which includes several skull elements. Another specimen, CPS 277, may represent a juvenile Coahuilaceratops. All specimens of Coahuilaceratops were collected from a single location in the middle strata of the Cerro del Pueblo Formation, which dates to between 72.5 and 71.4 million years ago.

 
It was formally described in 2010, though it appeared as an informal designation (nomen nudum) as early as 2008. Coahuilaceratops was named by Mark A. Loewen, Scott D. Sampson, Eric K. Lund, Andrew A. Farke, Martha C. Aguillón Martínez, C.A. de León, R.A. Rodríguez de la Rosa, Michael A. Getty and David A. Eberth in 2010 and the type species is Coahuilaceratops magnacuerna. Although based on incomplete remains, Coahuilaceratops is thought to possess among the largest horns of any dinosaur currently known, rivaling in absolute size those of larger chasmosaurines like Triceratops and Torosaurus. Its horns are estimated to have been up to 1.2 m (4 feet) long.

Systematics
Coahuilaceratops is a member of the Chasmosaurinae. Below is a cladogram that represents the findings of Caleb Brown and Donald Henderson (2015), finding Coahuilaceratops to be the sister taxon to the Texan Bravoceratops. 

This pairing was replicated by Jordan Mallon et al. in 2016, although Bravoceratops had to be cut from the analysis to create meaningful results.  In 2021, Sierraceratops was described and found to clade with Coahuilaceratops and Bravoceratops, and its describers, Sebastian Dalman et al., suggest they all form a clade unique to southern Laramidia.

See also 

 Timeline of ceratopsian research

References 

Chasmosaurines
Late Cretaceous dinosaurs of North America
Cretaceous Mexico
Fossils of Mexico
Fossil taxa described in 2010
Taxa named by Scott D. Sampson
Ornithischian genera